Macrozamia elegans is a species of plant in the family Zamiaceae. It is endemic to New South Wales, Australia.

This species grows in the Blue Mountains near the village of Mountain Lagoon. It occurs in dense vegetation in eucalypt woodland habitat.

References

elegans
Endangered flora of Australia
Flora of New South Wales
Taxonomy articles created by Polbot